Graeme Young (born Dunedin, New Zealand) is a former New Zealand born Scottish rugby union player and now coach who played for Glasgow Warriors and Stirling County at the Scrum-half position. He has coached Stirling County, Scotland Women and the Scotland Cub XV.

Rugby Union career

Amateur career
His parents both are Scottish - and Young emigrated to Scotland from New Zealand in 2000. He played for the Poneke club in Wellington before moving to Scotland.  Young played for amateur club Stirling County from 2000 Captaining the club to the Scottish Division Two championship

Provincial career
In New Zealand he represented the Otago and Wellington provinces.

Professional career
He made one appearance for the professional provincial side Glasgow Warriors; in the season 2000-01. Coming on as a replacement for Chris Black at scrum-half in 71 minutes, he turned out for Glasgow at Hughenden in a Welsh-Scottish League match against Cross Keys RFC on 2 September 2000. Glasgow won the match 52 - 28.

Coaching career
Young coached Stirling County from 2008, becoming head coach in 2011 leading the club to their highest league position in 17 years of 3rd place and back to back qualification for the British & Irish Cup.  He remained there till 2015.

He left Stirling and became an assistant coach with the Scotland women's national rugby union team who secured their first Six Nations victories in 7 seasons defeating Wales and Italy.

An HR manager professionally he has worked for media group Sky, Tesco Bank and as a Rugby Development Officer for Clackmanannshire Council.

References

Living people
Glasgow Warriors players
New Zealand rugby union players
Rugby union players from Dunedin
Scottish rugby union players
Stirling County RFC players
Year of birth missing (living people)
Rugby union scrum-halves